Thévenoud is a French surname. Notable people with the surname include:

Joanny Thévenoud (1878–1949), French Roman Catholic missionary
Thomas Thévenoud (born 1974), French politician

French-language surnames